Marcel Rozgonyi (born 28 January 1976 in Hoyerswerda) is a German former football player. He also holds Hungarian citizenship. He made his debut on the professional league level in the Bundesliga for FC Energie Cottbus on 17 August 2002 when he came on as a half-time substitute in the game against VfL Bochum.

Honours
 DFB-Pokal: 2001–02

References

1976 births
Living people
People from Hoyerswerda
German footballers
German people of Hungarian descent
1. FC Magdeburg players
FC Energie Cottbus players
1. FC Saarbrücken players
FC Sachsen Leipzig players
Bundesliga players
2. Bundesliga players
Association football defenders
Footballers from Saxony